The Health and Social Care Directorates are a group of directorates of the Scottish Government. They are responsible for NHS Scotland, as well as policies on the development and implementation of health and social care.

The Chief Executive of NHS Scotland and Director-General of the Scottish Government's Health and Social Care Directorates is Caroline Lamb.

There is a direct relationship between Ministers and the Directorates, but this relationship is not consistent across the Government as there is often no direct read across to Ministerial portfolios from DGs. The activities of these Directorates are under the purview of the Cabinet Secretary for Health and Social Care. He is assisted in this work by the Minister for Mental Health, Wellbeing and Social Care and the Minister for Public Health, Women's Health and Sport.

Structure
The current Directorates are:

Chief Medical Officer -  Chief Medical Officer: Sir Gregor Smith
Chief Nursing Officer - Chief Nursing Officer: Professor Amanda Croft
COVID Public Health Directorate - Director: Richard Foggo
Digital Health and Care Directorate - Interim Director: Jonathan Cameron
Health Finance, Corporate Governance and Value Directorate - Director: Richard McCallum
Health Performance and Delivery Directorate - Chief Performance Officer, NHS Scotland and Director of Delivery and Resilience: John Connaghan
Health Workforce Directorate - Director: Gillian Russell
Healthcare Quality and Improvement Directorate - Interim Director: Linda Pollock and National Clinical Director: Professor Jason Leitch
Mental Health and Social Care Directorate - Director: Donna Bell
Population Health Directorate - Interim Director: Michael Kellet
Primary Care Directorate - Director: Aidan Grisewood
Test and Protect - Director: Christine McLaughlin
Vaccine Strategy and Policy - Director: Stephen Gallagher

As well as responsibility for the regional health boards of NHS Scotland, the Directorates also have responsibility for:
 Public Health Scotland
 Mental Welfare Commission for Scotland
 Scottish Ambulance Service
 State Hospital
 NHS24
 Healthcare Improvement Scotland
 NHS National Services Scotland

There are six chief professional officers:

 Chief Dental Officer – Tom Ferris
 Chief Health Professions Officer – Carolyn McDonald
 Chief Medical Officer – Dr Gregor Smith 
 Chief Nursing Officer – Professor Amanda Croft
 Chief Pharmaceutical Officer - Professor Alison Strath
 Chief Scientist (Health) – Professor David Crossman

History
The Scottish Executive Health Department (SEHD) was created in 1999 from the former Scottish Office Health Department (SOHD) (previously part of the Scottish Office Home and Health Department).  The separate departments in the Scottish Government were abolished in 2007 and replaced with Directorates. In December 2010, the functions of the Health Directorates were taken on by the Health and Social Care Directorates.

See also
Social care in Scotland

References

External links
 Health and Social Care page on Scottish Government website
 Directorates page on Scottish Government website

Health
NHS Scotland
Scotland
Social care in Scotland